Marcus LaVar Stroud (born June 25, 1978) is a former American football defensive tackle who played in the National Football League (NFL) for ten seasons.  He played college football for the University of Georgia, and was drafted by the Jacksonville Jaguars 13th overall in the 2001 NFL Draft.  He was also a member of the NFL's Buffalo Bills and New England Patriots.

Early years 
Stroud won a state title with Brooks County High School in 1994. He appeared on the cover of Sports Illustrated in 1996 while still in high school which featured a cover story of National Signing Day. Stroud, at the time a 6'6" 266-pound defensive end, originally gave Florida a verbal commitment but changed his mind after Bulldogs coach Ray Goff was fired in November 1995. After heavy pursuit from new Georgia coach Jim Donnan, Stroud switched and committed to the Bulldogs on Signing Day.

College career 
Stroud attended the University of Georgia, where he played for the Georgia Bulldogs football team.  He played for Georgia during a major re-building era, in which coach Jim Donnan turned the program around from among the mediocre to averaging 8 wins per year, including four straight bowl game victories.

He was initiated as a member of Phi Beta Sigma fraternity while he was an undergraduate.

Professional career

Jacksonville Jaguars 
Stroud was selected 13th in the 2001 NFL Draft by the Jaguars. The 2001 NFL Draft is considered by many experts to be the finest draft for defensive tackles in draft history, and Stroud was among the highest rated of the group that year. The 2001 class included fellow Pro Bowl selections Richard Seymour, Casey Hampton and Kris Jenkins.

He and John Henderson helped give the Jaguars one of the more dominant defensive tackles duos in the NFL.

During his Jacksonville days, Stroud had 22 sacks and 256 tackles while appearing in 100 games. Stroud also played in every Jaguars game for the first 5 years of his career.

Marcus Stroud was selected to the Pro Bowl following the 2003, 2004 and 2005 NFL seasons.

Stroud was suspended in 2007 for four games without pay for violating the league's policy on anabolic steroids and related substances.

Buffalo Bills 
On March 1, 2008 Stroud was traded to the Buffalo Bills for third- and fifth-round picks in the 2008 NFL Draft.

Stroud was immediately deemed one of the key players to the Bills' 2008 season. Buffalo ranked 31st in total defense the year prior, and vaulted up to 14th in 2008, Stroud's first season there. The Bills got off to a strong start that year, going 5-1 in the first six games. They fell off towards the mid-season mark, however, and finished the year with a 7-9 record.

On April 7, 2009, Stroud signed a two-year contract extension that paid $16 million and guaranteed $12 million. In combination with the existing terms of his contract, Stroud could've earned an additional $28 million over the following four seasons.
Stroud was released on February 16, 2011 by the Bills.

New England Patriots 
On March 1, 2011 the New England Patriots signed defensive lineman Stroud to a two-year contract. He was released just under 5 months later on July 28.

Retirement 
In June 2012, Stroud signed a one-day contract with the Jaguars and announced his retirement. He became the fifth player to re-sign with Jacksonville before retiring, joining Tony Boselli, Fred Taylor, Paul Spicer and Donovin Darius.

NFL statistics

Community 
During his NFL days, Stroud founded the Marcus Stroud Charitable Foundation to assist underprivileged youth who lived in low-income, single-parent homes, according to its website, by establishing various academic and athletic programs otherwise unavailable to them. Additionally, Stroud hosts an annual football camp aimed to combat childhood obesity.

Stroud hosted the Marcus Stroud 99 Pro Bowl Football Camp For Kids in May 2009 at Brooks County's Veterans Stadium in Georgia. Several NFL players, including Mike Peterson and Verron Haynes of the Atlanta Falcons, and George Wilson, Donte Whitner, Kavika Mitchell, Marcus Buggs and Drayton Florence of the Buffalo Bills contributed to the free camp.

Personal 
Stroud has a passion for classic cars and eventually founded his own auto body business, DeciBels Auto Creations, in Jacksonville.

Stroud escaped injury in 2005, when he rolled his SUV while driving on Florida's Interstate 10 outside of Jacksonville.

References 

1978 births
Living people
American football defensive tackles
American football defensive ends
Intelligent design advocates
Georgia Bulldogs football players
Jacksonville Jaguars players
Buffalo Bills players
American Conference Pro Bowl players
American wushu practitioners
People from Thomasville, Georgia
Players of American football from Georgia (U.S. state)